Ptychodes mixtus is a species of beetle in the family Cerambycidae. It was described by Henry Walter Bates in 1880. It is known from Panama.

References

Lamiini
Beetles described in 1880